Ernst Leopold Christian Mielck (24 October 187722 October 1899) was a Finnish composer and pianist of the late Romantic period. A precocious but sickly youth, his promising career was cut short in its infancy when he died of consumption in Locarno, Switzerland, two days before his twenty-second birthday. As a result, Mielck's  is small; his most acclaimed compositions are the Symphony in F minor (Op. 4; 1897) and the Dramatic Overture (Op. 6; 1898).

Life

Mielck was born in Viipuri (Vyborg).  He started piano lessons at the age of ten; in 1891 he was sent to Berlin, where he studied under Max Bruch, one of the leading composers of the period. Bruch said of Mielck that he had "an easy, felicitous, and remarkable flair for invention." Mielck returned to Finland in 1896. Three years later he died of tuberculosis in Switzerland, just two days before his 22nd birthday.

Music
Mielck composed all his works in the short span of four years. His catalogue includes a number of works in the field of chamber music, including a string quintet and a string quartet. He also composed the Symphony in F minor (1897), two overtures, a concert piece for piano and orchestra, as well as one for violin and orchestra, the Finnish Suite, and two major vocal works in the German language.

Mielck faced disappointment in his home country for the lack—with the exception of the Finnish Suite—of nationalistic (political) tendencies; his interest in the culture of his ancestral Germany made him rather a foreigner in the Finnish music scene.

It was in Germany, shortly before his death, that Mielck found his greatest success.

The enthusiasm aroused in the critics—mainly  in —by the premiere of Mielck's symphony, on 20 October 1897, conducted by Robert Kajanus, was a motivation that prompted Jean Sibelius to try his hand at his a symphony.

List of works

With opus number
 Op. 1: String Quartet in G minor, for two violins, viola, and cello (1895)
 Op. 2:  (Macbeth Overture), for orchestra (1896)
 Op. 3: String Quintet in F major, for two violins, two violas, and cello (1897)
 Op. 4: Symphony in F minor, for orchestra (1897)
 Op. 5:  (Old Bohemian Christmas Song), cantata for mixed chorus and orchestra (1898)
 Op. 6:  (Dramatic Overture), for orchestra (1898)
 Op. 7:  (Old German Yule Feast), cantata for baritone, male chorus, and orchestra (1898)
 Op. 8: Concert Piece in D major, for violin and orchestra (1898)
 Op. 9: Concert Piece in E minor, for piano and orchestra (1898)
 Op 10:  (Finnish Suite), for orchestra (1899)

Without opus number
 Romance, for cello and piano (1894)
 Three Fantasy Pieces on Finnish Polska Motifs (1895)
 En blomma, Morgenlied, Stjernorna, and Wanderlied, for male chorus (1897)
 Two Impromptus, for piano (1899)
 Sarabande in G minor, for piano (1899)

Songs for voice and piano
 Das Fischermädchen (Text: Theodor Fontane)
 Letzter Wunsch (Text: Julius Sturm)
 Frage (Text: Julius Wolff)
 Heimath (Text: Theodor Fontane)

References

External links
Biography on Toccata
Music finland with scores to check

Some information about Mielck's chamber music provided by Kimmo Korhonen (this link is dead)
Article about Mielck dd Sep. 2012 by Kimmo Korhonen
 

1877 births
1899 deaths
Musicians from Vyborg
People from Viipuri Province (Grand Duchy of Finland)
Finnish people of German descent
Finnish classical composers
Romantic composers
19th-century deaths from tuberculosis
Baltic-German people
Tuberculosis deaths in Switzerland
19th-century classical composers
Finnish male classical composers
19th-century male musicians
20th-century Finnish composers